Ravi Chauhan (born 17 September 1993) is an Indian cricketer who plays for Services. He made his first-class debut on 1 October 2015 in the 2015–16 Ranji Trophy. He made his Twenty20 debut for Services in the 2016–17 Inter State Twenty-20 Tournament on 2 February 2017.

He was the leading run-scorer for Services in the 2017–18 Ranji Trophy, with 457 runs in six matches.

He made his List A debut for Services in the 2018–19 Vijay Hazare Trophy on 25 September 2018.

References

External links
 

1993 births
Living people
Indian cricketers
Services cricketers
People from New Delhi